Wayne Jude Matherne (born May 6, 1949) is a retired Canadian football player who played for the BC Lions and Edmonton Eskimos. He won the Grey Cup with Edmonton in 1975.  Nickname was the "Ragin' Cajun". He played college football at Northeastern Louisiana University.

References

1949 births
Living people
Edmonton Elks players
American football defensive backs
Canadian football defensive backs
American players of Canadian football
Louisiana–Monroe Warhawks football players
Players of American football from Louisiana